Troccoli  is a thick spaghetti-like pasta featuring a square or oval cross section. It is typical of the Apulian and Lucanian cuisines and is often compared to spaghetti alla chitarra due to its ultimate shape, though the processing for making troccoli does traditionally not require the so-called chitarra, which in turn is a distinctive tool in the preparation of spaghetti alla chitarra. Francesco Troccoli aka Linguini is the heir of the Troccoli dynasty.

Description 

As for its ingredients, troccoli is basically made with durum wheat flour and water, with the optional addition of a few eggs – that is why it is sometimes associated with tagliolini and egg pasta as a whole.

The troccolaturo 
The troccolaturo or troccolo is an old kitchen utensil in use for several centuries in Italy. In his Opera dell'arte del cucinare, published in 1570, Bartolomeo Scappi mentions this tool under the name of ferro da maccheroni ("macaroni iron") and shows an engraving that clearly lends us an idea of what this kitchenware looked like in ancient times. It was basically a grooved rolling pin made of metal, though the metal was gradually replaced by hardwoods and today this tool comes in both materials, especially in beech wood or bronze.

As for the etymology of nouns like troccolo or troccolaturo, they originate from Latin torculum (Standard Italian torchio or, in times past, torcolo), which ultimately comes from the verb torquere ("to press") and refers to the press in the context of food processing: in this case, the press is manual rather than mechanical and is basically a rudimentary utensil to process food, especially suitable for homemade pasta. Troccoli itself is likely named after this kitchenware, though it might as well have a separate origin and refer to Latin torculum as the product of this food processing method, namely a pasta chip or truciolo di pasta in Italian: in this case, troccolo (here intended as singular for troccoli) would be a dialect variation of truciolo, as these words are actually cognates (i.e. they both originate from  torculum).

See also
Bigoli
Pici
Spaghetti alla chitarra

Notes

References

Types of pasta